Anthony Bailey may refer to:
 Anthony Bailey (author) (1933–2020), British writer and art historian
 Anthony Bailey (PR advisor) (born 1970), British public relations consultant

See also
Tony Bailie, novelist and journalist